Piscitelli is an Italian surname. Notable people with the surname include:

Mike Piscitelli, American music video director
Riccardo Piscitelli (born 1993), Italian footballer
Sabby Piscitelli (born 1983), American professional wrestler and football player

Italian-language surnames